Route 313 is an  north–south secondary highway in the northeast Canadian province of New Brunswick on Lameque Island.

The route's southern terminus is near the center of Lameque Island, and it begins by running along the western coast of the island. The route (named Rue Principale) travels northwest through the town of Lameque. From here, the highway follows Chaleur Bay through the communities of Pointe-Alexandre, Petite-Lameque, and Pointe-Canot before turning northeast through the communities of Sainte-Cécile and Petite-Riviere-de-l'Ile. It ends at an intersection with Route 113 in the community of Little Shippagan.

See also
List of New Brunswick provincial highways

References

313
313